Euphorbia balsamifera (balsam spurge) is a flowering plant in the spurge family Euphorbiaceae. It is distributed in the Canary Islands and the western Sahara. It is the vegetable symbol of the island of Lanzarote. Euphorbia adenensis has been treated as a subspecies of this species.

Description
The plant varies greatly in height. It can be described both as a low shrub or as a small tree from 2–5 meters tall. The stems are up to 15 cm in diameter, semisucculent without spines, covered with transverse leaf-scars. The color of the stem varies from gray to terra-cotta. It is branched from the base, the older parts gradually becoming knotty and very thick. The leaves are 80 millimeters long and 4–8 millimeters wide clustered at the tips of the stems. They are green and glaucous, sessile, varying in shape from linear-lanceolate to ovate. The inflorescences are terminal cymes, usually reduced to a single semi-sessile 6 millimeters wide cyathium at the tip of each stem. The color of pseudo-petals is yellowish green. The fruit of the plant is a green large capsule 10 millimeters long and 9 millimeters wide, pinkish-reddish-green when ripened. It is shallowly lobed, smooth or hairy and semi-sessile.

Subspecies
Two subspecies have been distinguished, but Euphoria balsamifera subsp. adenensis is now accepted as a separate species, Euphorbia adenensis.

Distribution and habitat
Euphorbia balsamifera is native to the Canary Islands, western Morocco and Western Sahara.

The tree grows 800 meters above sea level in dense communities on rocky grounds and sandy dunes (except for extremely mobile dunes) in plains among other succulent plants.

Uses
Milky latex of Euphorbia balsamifera is poisonous like in other Euphorbia species, but it is not so caustic. In Morocco, it is widely used in dentistry as anesthesia for acute dental pulpitis treatment.

The leaves were gathered and cooked as a green vegetable in the Canary Islands.

As most other succulent members of the genus Euphorbia, its trade is regulated under Appendix II of CITES.

See also
 List of animal and plant symbols of the Canary Islands
 Euphorbia kamerunica, closely related plant in Africa with similar uses

References

External links

balsamifera
balsamifera
Flora of the Canary Islands
Flora of North Africa
Flora of Morocco
Flora of Yemen
Flora of Saudi Arabia
Flora of Western Sahara